Joachim Schlichting (1 February 1914 – 7 July 1982) was a German aviator in the Luftwaffe during the Spanish Civil War and World War II. He was a recipient of the Knight's Cross of the Iron Cross of Nazi Germany.

Career
Joachim Schlichting joined the pre-war Luftwaffe, and served with the Condor Legion from 6 September 1937 to 28 May 1938 during the Spanish Civil War. He was awarded the Spanish Cross in Gold with Swords and Diamonds upon his return on 6 June 1938. Schlichting joined the Lehrgeschwader 2 in November 1938, with which he took part in the Invasion of Poland in September 1939.

On 1 November 1939 he was transferred as Geschwader Adjutant of the newly formed Jagdgeschwader 27 (JG 27—27th Fighter Wing) under Geschwaderkommodore Max Ibel. He was promoted again on 1 February 1940, to lead I./Jagdgeschwader 1 as Gruppenkommandeur. In the campaign against France he shot down a Bristol Blenheim on 12 May and a LeO 45 on 6 June. At the end of the campaign (on 5 July) the unit was redesignated III./JG 27. In the Battle of Britain he claimed his 8th victory (a Spitfire of 152 Squadron ; S/L P. Devitt returned to base, damaged) over Portland on 25 July 1940.

On 6 September 1940, Schlichting was shot down in his Messerschmitt Bf 109 E-4 (Werknummer 1380—factory number) near Shoeburyness. He was flying a bomber escort mission attacking Thameshaven when his aircraft experienced engine problems. Forced to turn back, he came under attack by Royal Air Force (RAF) fighters from either No. 41 or No. 222 Squadron. He baled out near the Shoeburyness artillery ranges and was taken prisoner by the British forces.

The presentation of the Knight's Cross of the Iron Cross was made over a year later on 31 October 1941 in British captivity. In late November, he was promoted to Major (major).

His 8 victories came in over 100 combat missions. After World war II he joined the Bundeswehr of the Federal Republic of Germany and served as the Chief of Staff of the 5. Luftwaffendivision (5th Air Division of the Bundeswehr) in 1963.

Summary of career

Aerial victory claims
According to US historian David T. Zabecki, Schlichting was credited with eight aerial victories, five of which during the Spanish Civil War.

Awards
 Spanish Cross in Gold with Swords and Diamonds (6 June 1939)
 Iron Cross (1939) 2nd and 1st Class
 Knight's Cross of the Iron Cross on 14 December 1940 Hauptmann and Gruppenkommandeur of the III./Jagdgeschwader 27

Notes

References

Citations

Bibliography

 
 
 
 
 
 
 
 
 Weal, John (1996). Bf109D/E Aces 1939-41. Oxford: Osprey Publishing Limited. .
 

1914 births
1982 deaths
Military personnel from Kassel
People from Hesse-Nassau
German Air Force personnel
Condor Legion personnel
Spanish Civil War flying aces
German World War II flying aces
German military personnel of the Spanish Civil War
Recipients of the Knight's Cross of the Iron Cross
German prisoners of war in World War II held by the United Kingdom